Eran Kulik (born 1946) is a former Israeli footballer and currently works as a manager.

References

1946 births
Living people
Israeli Jews
Israeli footballers
Footballers from Herzliya
Maccabi Herzliya F.C. players
Israeli football managers
Maccabi Haifa F.C. managers
Maccabi Herzliya F.C. managers
Maccabi Kiryat Gat F.C. managers
Hapoel Kiryat Ono F.C. managers
Maccabi Ironi Ashdod F.C. managers
Hapoel Ra'anana A.F.C. managers
Hapoel Bnei Lod F.C. managers
Bnei Sakhnin F.C. managers
Hapoel Nir Ramat HaSharon F.C. managers
Israeli Premier League managers
Association footballers not categorized by position